Agustín Velotti was the defending champion but was not eligible to participate.
Bjorn Fratangelo won this event, defeating 14th-seed Dominic Thiem 3–6, 6–3, 8–6 in the final.

Seeds

Main draw

Finals

Top half

Section 1

Section 2

Bottom half

Section 3

Section 4

References
Main Draw

Boys' Singles
2011